Takvam is a surname. Notable people with the surname include:

Andreas Takvam (born 1993), Norwegian volleyball player
Magnus Takvam (born 1952), Norwegian journalist
Marie Takvam (1926–2008), Norwegian poet, novelist, writer of children's books, playwright, and actress

Norwegian-language surnames